Makhdoomzada Syed Hasan Mahmood (27 November 1922 – 25 August 1986) was a Pakistani cricket patron, administrator, and politician who served as the Chief Minister of Bahawalpur State. He also served as the Leader of the Opposition in the Provincial Assembly of the Punjab between Feb 1986 and Aug 1986.

He played first-class cricket for Bahawalpur and Karachi cricket team in 1951/52.

He also served as a vice president of the Board of Control for Cricket in Pakistan (BCCP) and also chairman of the selection panel in 1954.

References

1922 births
1986 deaths
Pakistani cricketers
People from Rahim Yar Khan District
Punjab MPAs 1985–1988
Leaders of the Opposition in the Provincial Assembly of the Punjab